Aston is a lunar impact crater that is located along the northwest limb of the Moon. Because of its location the crater is seen nearly from on edge, and visibility is subject to libration. It lies to the east of the crater Röntgen, some distance due west of Ulugh Beigh on the edge of the Oceanus Procellarum. To the south is the crater Voskresenskiy.

The rim of Aston has been worn down and rounded due to subsequent impacts. It forms a circular shape that has not been significantly altered by nearby impacts. The interior floor is relatively flat and featureless, with no central peak of significance.

Satellite craters
By convention these features are identified on lunar maps by placing the letter on the side of the crater midpoint that is closest to Aston.

References

External links
 

Impact craters on the Moon